"Silver Star" is an intermezzo composed by Charles L. Johnson in 1910. In 1911, William R. Clay added lyrics which tell of an Indian warrior eloping with an unnamed Indian maiden whom he refers to as his "silver star".

Lyrics
The lyrics as written by Clay:

References

Bibliography
Clay, William R. (w.); Johnson, Charles L. (m.). "Silver Star" (Sheet music). Kansas City, MO: J.W. Jenkins Sons Music Co. (1911).
Johnson, Charles L. (m.). "Silver Star" (Sheet music). Kansas City, MO: J.W. Jenkins Sons Music Co. (1910).

External links
"Silver Star", Ada Jones & Billy Murray (Edison Blue Amberol 1858, 1913)—Cylinder Preservation and Digitization Project. 
"Silver Star", Gladys Rice & George W. Ballard (Edison Blue Amberol 3068, 1917)—Cylinder Preservation and Digitization Project.

1910 songs